A mikan is a citrus fruit, also variously called Citrus unshiu, unshu mikan, Wenzhou migan, or a satsuma. 

Mikan may also refer to:

People
 Joseph Gottfried Mikan (also J.G. Mikan; 1743–1814), Austrian-Czech botanist
 Johann Christian Mikan (also J.C. Mikan; 1769–1844),  Austrian-Czech botanist, zoologist, and entomologist, son of Joseph Gottfried Mikan
 George Mikan (1924–2005), American professional basketball player
 Mikan Drill, basketball drill commonly credited to George Mikan and Ray Meyer
 Ed Mikan (1925–1999), American basketball player, younger brother of George Mikan
 Larry Mikan (born 1948), American basketball player, son of George Mikan
 George L. Mikan III (born 1971), American businessman, son of Larry Mikan

Fictional characters
 Mikan Sakura, fictional character in the manga and anime series Alice Academy
 Mikan Yuuki, fictional character from the Japanese anime and manga series To Love-Ru
 Mikan Tsumiki, fictional character from the Danganronpa series
 Jasmine (Pokémon) (known as Mikan in the Japanese version), a Johto gym leader from the Pokémon series
Mikan, fictional character in the eroge visual novel Wanko to Kurasō

Music
 "Mikan" (song), 2007 single by J-pop idol group Morning Musume

See also
 Mikanic, South African rock group
 Bemerhak Negia Mikan (English: A Touch Away), album by Israeli rock singer and guitarist Izhar Ashdot
 Mikan Enikki (English: Mikan Picture Diary), Japanese manga series by Miwa Abiko